The following is a timeline of the COVID-19 pandemic in Canada:

Data

Timeline of cases and deaths in Canada

Timeline of cases and deaths by province and territory

Overview of infection waves

Breakdown by year (2020-2023)

Note: This table is updated once every three months (next update: May 10, 2023).

Note: This table is updated once every three months (next update: May 10, 2023).

Deaths by year

Top 50 days with most deaths

Of the 50 days, 21 occurred in 2020, 13 in 2021, and 16 in 2022. The data is correct as of April 25, 2022. Since then, reliable daily statistics are no longer available, as by that date most Provinces and Territories had already switched from daily reports to weekly reports.

Top 30 weeks with most deaths

Of the 30 weeks, 14 occurred in 2020, 7 in 2021, and 9 in 2022. 7 instances were recorded in January, 6 in February, 5 in December, 4 in April and May, 2 in November, and 1 in June and July.

Top 10 months with most deaths

Top 15 weeks with most new cases

Graphs

National

Milestones (as of January 28, 2023) 
This graph shows dates when milestones (250,000 new cases) were reached.

Note: This graph is updated whenever the next milestone is reached. At the current rate of new cases, the next milestone (5,000,000 cases) is expected to be reached around October 15, 2023.

Waves (as of April 25, 2022) 
This simplified graph shows the first five waves, noting number of cases at the peak and at the end of each wave. There is no reliable tracking data on recoveries since March 1, 2022 and further waves could only be estimated based on the number of hospitalizations, however this data not reliable enough to warrant any further updates, thus this graph has been discontinued.

Note: This graph will no longer be updated.

Cases (as of January 28, 2023) 
This graph shows the number of new cases in Canada each month.

Note: This graph is updated once a month (next update: March 7, 2023).

Deaths (as of January 28, 2023) 
This graph shows the number of deaths in Canada each month.

Note: This graph is updated once a month (next update: March 7, 2023).

Provinces and Territories

Cases (as of January 28, 2023) 
This graph shows the number of new cases per month in each of the Provinces and Territories.

Note: This graph is updated once a month (next update: March 7, 2023).

Deaths (as of January 28, 2023) 
This graph shows the number of deaths per month in each of the Provinces and Territories.

Note: This graph is updated once a month (next update: March 7, 2023).

Overviews by Year

Cases and Deaths in Canada (2020-2023)  
This graph shows the number of new cases and the number of deaths in Canada each year from 2020 to 2023.

Note: This graph is updated once a month (next update: March 7, 2023).

Cases in Provinces and Territories (2020-2023) 
This graph shows the number of new cases in each of the Provinces and Territories each year from 2020 to 2023.

Note: This graph is updated once a month (next update: March 7, 2023).

Deaths in Provinces and Territories (2020-2023) 
This graph shows the number of deaths in each of the Provinces and Territories each year from 2020 to 2023.

Note: This graph is updated once a month (next update: March 7, 2023).

2019

December 
In April, Jitendra Prasad, the leader of Alberta Health Services' procurement department told the Edmonton Journal that in early December, he had heard from sources in China of a strange flu. Prasad claimed that by mid-December, he had started doubling orders of PPE, and in late December, he placed an order for a half a million N95 masks.

On December 31, 2019, the Wuhan Municipal Health Commission in China reported a cluster of cases of pneumonia in Wuhan, Hubei Province. This news spread to FluTrackers, and then similar announcements came from the Hong Kong and Taiwan governments and many news outlets on the outbreak in Wuhan.  A novel coronavirus was eventually identified.

2020

January 
On January 7, 2020, when it appeared that there was a health crisis emerging in Wuhan, Dr. Theresa Tam, Chief Public Health Officer of Canada, was quoted advising Canadians: "There has been no evidence to date that this illness, whatever it's caused by, is spread easily from person to person; no health care workers caring for the patients have become ill; a positive sign.

On January 17, the Canada Border Services Agency (CBSA) indicated plans were in progress "to implement signage" in the Montreal, Toronto, and Vancouver airports to raise awareness of the virus, and that there would be an additional health screening question added to the electronic kiosks for passengers arriving from central China. The agency noted the overall risk to Canadians was low and there were no direct flights from Wuhan to Canada. The CBSA said it would not be, at that time, implementing extra screening measures, but would "monitor the situation closely".

On January 23, the federal Minister of Health, Patty Hajdu, said that five or six people were being monitored for signs of the virus. That same day, Dr. Theresa Tam was a member of the WHO committee that broadcast that it was too early to declare a public health emergency of international concern. The following day in Wuhan China construction began on a new hospital to treat COVID patients that would take only 10 days to build and was widely reported around the world.

On January 25, the first identified presumptive case in Canada was a male in his 50s who travelled between Wuhan and Guangzhou before returning to Toronto on January 22. Canada issued a travel advisory against non-essential travel to China due to the outbreak, including a regional travel advisory to avoid all travel to the province of Hubei. Federal health officials stated that the risk in Canada was low. On January 26, Tam stated "There is no clear evidence that this virus is spread easily from person to person. The risk to Canadians remains low."
Final testing conducted at the National Microbiology Laboratory in Winnipeg, Manitoba confirmed the presumptive case on January 27. On January 27, Canada confirmed its first case.

On January 29, the health committee of parliament holds a meeting on the Canadian response to the outbreak of coronavirus.  Liberal MP Marcus Powlowski, a doctor, asks Theresa Tam since the Chinese health authorities led by Xiaowei Ma were saying that covid-19 was being spread by asymptomatic patients (as reported in the New York Times), Canada should require travellers from China to quarantine for 14 days.  Tam suggested that at that point, quarantining was not thought to be necessary.  On the same day, Dr. Theresa Tam told Canadians that "It's going to be rare (COVID-19), but we are expecting cases" and Minister of Foreign Affairs François-Philippe Champagne announced that an aircraft would be sent to repatriate Canadians from the areas affected by the virus in China.

On January 30, the WHO declared the coronavirus was a "public health emergency of international concern".

February 
On February 1,  the government's position remained that it would be discriminatory to exclude travellers from China, the politico-geographical source of the disease.

On February 2, the Canadian Armed Forces announced that it planned to charter a plane to assist in the evacuation of Canadian nationals still in Wuhan once given authorization by China, intending to fly them to CFB Trenton for repatriation and medical screenings. Only those that had entered the country with a Canadian passport would be allowed to take this flight. The first plane landed at CFB Trenton on February 7. On February 21, a chartered flight of 131 Canadians who were quarantined aboard  after an outbreak on the cruise ship in Japan, and who all tested negative for the virus, were brought to CFB Trenton for additional screening before being transported by bus to the NAV Centre in Cornwall, Ontario to be quarantined.

On February 10, University of Regina psychology professor Dr. Gordon J. G. Asmundson and University of British Columbia psychiatry professor Dr. Steven Taylor coined the neologism ‘coronaphobia’ to refer to fear of COVID-19 and its psychological impacts. In an editorial, Asmundson and Taylor expanded on COVID-19-related mental health impacts by introducing the constructs of COVID Stress Syndrome and ‘COVID Stress Disorder’. Per Asmundson and Taylor’s definition, COVID Stress Syndrome centers around fears about contamination and the dangerousness of COVID-19, and also involves fears of socioeconomic consequences, xenophobic attitudes, traumatic stress, and compulsive checking and reassurance seeking symptoms. COVID Stress Disorder involves high levels of COVID Stress symptoms and severe functional impairment resulting from these symptoms. COVID Stress Disorder is proposed by Asmundson and Taylor as a distinct diagnostic category as COVID Stress symptoms and the associated impairment cannot be accounted for by existing mental disorder diagnoses.

On February 26, Minister of Health Patty Hajdu recommended that citizens stockpile food and medication, noting that it was "good to be prepared because things can change quickly [in any emergency]." The recommendation faced criticism from provincial politicians: Manitoba health minister Cameron Friesen and Ontario health minister Christine Elliott both felt that there was no need for such aggressive stockpiling, while Friesen also felt that there needed to be more coordination between the federal and provincial levels in terms of information regarding the outbreak. Conservative Party shadow minister Matt Jeneroux opined that the suggestion incited concern and was lacking in transparency. Health Canada's website recommended against such bulk purchases (as to not strain supply chains), and explained that having supplies on hand was to "ensure you do not need to leave your home at the peak of the outbreak or if you become ill."

March 

On March 4, 2020, Trudeau announced his creation of the Cabinet Committee on the federal response to the coronavirus disease, chaired by Chrystia Freeland, "to limit the spread of the virus" and to protect "the health and safety of all Canadians".

Minister of Health Patty Hajdu announced on March 6 that the federal government would offer $27 million in funding to 47 research groups at 19 universities to develop means of managing the outbreak. Minister of Finance Bill Morneau stated that the next federal budget would include measures in response to the outbreak, including an increase to the risk adjustment provision.

On March 8, Minister of Foreign Affairs François-Philippe Champagne stated that at the request of the U.S. government, Canada had chartered a EuroAtlantic passenger airplane to evacuate the 237 citizens that were still aboard the cruise ship . They were quarantined at CFB Trenton for two weeks when the plane landed on March 10.

Member of Parliament Anthony Housefather announced on March 9 that he was undergoing self-isolation as a precautionary measure due to possible contact with a person at an American Israel Public Affairs Committee (AIPAC) conference in Washington. The next day, Minister of Natural Resources Seamus O'Regan stated that he was also in self-isolation while awaiting the results of a coronavirus test. He had seen a doctor regarding a "persistent" head cold, who recommended testing, but was "not aware of contacting anyone infected". The test came back negative.

On March 11, Prime Minister Justin Trudeau announced a $1 billion response fund, including $500 million to go to provinces and territories, a $50 million contribution to the World Health Organization and an additional $275 million to fund COVID-19 research in Canada. Minister of Economic Development and Official Languages Mélanie Joly stated that she had been discussing means of mitigating the outbreak's impact on the air travel industry.

On March 11, the World Health Organization declared the virus to be the cause of a worldwide COVID-19 pandemic.

On March 12, after returning from a speaking engagement in London, England, Trudeau's wife Sophie Grégoire Trudeau tested positive for COVID-19. She and the Prime Minister went into self-isolation. The staff member is now thought to be Canada's first case of community transmission.  The Toronto Stock Exchange tumbles 1770 points.

On March 13, Trudeau announced that the federal government was preparing a stimulus package to address those affected by the pandemic.

Also on March 13, Parliament agreed unanimously to shut its doors for five weeks (pursuant to Standing Order 28) because of COVID-19.

On March 16, Trudeau announced that new entry restrictions would be implemented shortly after midnight ET on March 18, restricting entry into the country to Americans and Canadian citizens and permanent residents and their families and flight crew members who are not displaying symptoms of covid-19.  All people arriving were asked to self-isolate for 14 days.  Most international flights were routed to Canada's an arbitrary selection of four airports (YVR, YYC, YYZ, and YUL) in order "to enhance screening measures". Minister of Foreign Affairs François-Philippe Champagne also announced that for citizens who are still abroad, the country would provide emergency loans of up to $5,000 to cover travel costs or basic needs until they are able to return.

The border closure led to a million Canadians returning home over the next week.  Passengers from East Asian countries wore masks on their flights, but those arriving from Europe did not.  Masks were not even recommended.  There were no temperature checks.  People were packed in close at airport waiting areas.  Hand sanitizer dispensers had not been installed.  Not everyone received the pamphlets instructing them to self-isolate for 14 days.

On March 17, Ontario Premier Doug Ford declared a state of emergency, calling for the closure of indoor recreation facilities, restaurants, libraries, theatres and concert halls.

On March 18, Donald Trump and Justin Trudeau announced that the Canada-U.S. border would close to non-essential travel.  People entering Canada would be asked to self-isolate for 14 days. Family of Canadian citizens, students and foreign workers with visas would be allowed to enter. Truckers and flight crews carrying essential goods did not need to self-isolate.

Theresa Tam, Chief Public Health Officer of Canada and head of the Public Health Agency of Canada (PHAC), said on March 19 that Canada would not know for two or three weeks if country-wide social distancing efforts have curbed the spread of COVID-19.

On March 24, 35 members of parliament met in order to discuss Bill C-13, the COVID-19 Emergency Response Act. To maintain social distancing in the face of the highly contagious respiratory illness, only 35 of the 338 members of the House of Commons convened to debate the legislation. The Commons agreed "to see the application of Standing Order 17 (sic) suspended for the current sitting to allow (its) members the practice of social distancing."

On March 24, 2020, a small number of MPs from each party met in the House of Commons to vote on an $82-billion emergency spending legislation, known as Bill C-13. The passage of the bill was stalled due to the federal government's proposed clauses that gave the finance minister the right to spend money and raise taxes without the approval of Parliament until December 31, 2021. After criticism from the Official Opposition over the minority government's "power grab" which was considered undemocratic, a revised bill was agreed upon the next day that would permit the government six months of special spending powers until September 30, 2020, with oversight from a Parliamentary committee. The House of Commons' Health and Finance committees began holding weekly virtual meetings during the pandemic.

Meanwhile, Dr. Theresa Tam was quoted as saying regarding Canadians' need to wear face masks: "most people haven't learned how to use masks" and "there is no need to use a mask for well people."

On March 28, Sophie Grégoire Trudeau announced her full recovery and thanked her well-wishers via social media.

The unemployment figures for the month of March were that the economy had shed 1,000,000 jobs, pushing the official jobless rate to 7.8 percent.

April 

On April 2, Trudeau said that he foresaw the expiry of the COVID-19 crisis to occur only in July.

On April 2, American President Donald Trump slammed 3M after invoking the US Defense Production Act of 1950 to get the company to produce N95 respirators and on April 3, Canadian officials protested a move by Trump to block 3M's export of N95 masks for use by doctors and nurses as COVID-19 cases were projected to soar in Ontario and Quebec. Deputy Prime Minister Chrystia Freeland said Canada would "do whatever it takes to defend the national interest." On April 6, the Trump administration agreed to a deal with the 3M to import more than 166 million respirators from China over the next three months and allow 3M to continue exporting its US made respirators to Canada.

On April 5, Queen Elizabeth addressed the Commonwealth in a televised broadcast, in which she asked people to "take comfort that while we may have more still to endure, better days will return". She added, "we will be with our friends again; we will be with our families again; we will meet again".

On April 6, Trudeau introduced extra aid for the Canada Emergency Response Benefit (CERB), saying "there are groups of people who aren't benefiting from [it] who probably should."
 
Also on April 6, Theresa Tam, the CPHO of Canada, noted that people with COVID-19 may be contagious even if they are pre-symptomatic or asymptomatic.  She advised the use of a "non-medical face mask when shopping or using public transit" because "A non-medical mask can reduce the chance of your respiratory droplets coming into contact with others or land[ing] on surfaces". Tam offered advice on how to use "a cotton shirt combined with rubber bands" to create a DIY non-medical face mask.

On April 7, Trudeau brought up the topic of masks, where he said, "If people want to wear a mask, that is okay. It protects others more than it protects you, because it prevents you from breathing or... or... speaking, uh... 'moistly' on them." He immediately regrets his word choice and says, "Ugh, what a terrible image." The unusual word choice has led the creation of a remix song, "Speaking Moistly", based on the speech.

On April 9, the federal government released modelling that, even with strong public health measures, showed between 11,000 and 22,000 deaths over the course of the pandemic, with that number being closer to 300,000 deaths if no measures had been taken. Trudeau warned that "normality as it was before will not come back full-on until we get a vaccine for this", and that residents would "have to remain vigilant for at least a year." The same day, Trudeau sent a letter to the provincial and territorial premiers to consult about invoking the Emergencies Act. While consultation with the provinces is a required step before the Act can be triggered, the Prime Minister's Office said there was no present plan to enact it and that doing so remained a last resort. On a conference call between Trudeau and the premiers later that day, the premiers communicated their unanimous opposition to invoking the Act.

On April 10, the RCMP disclosed it has been asked to enforce the Quarantine Act, 2005. Penalties for violations can include a fine of up to $750,000 and imprisonment for six months. One reporter said that the RCMP "could enter homes to enforce Quarantine Act orders if Canadians don't self-isolate... [and] will do physical checks to enforce it." It was reported that the Canadian Forces Intelligence Command Medical Intelligence Cell (MEDINT) has submitted reports on the outbreak in Wuhan since January 2020.

On April 11, Parliament re-convened to pass Bill C-14: COVID-19 Emergency Response Act, No. 2, and thereby adopt the CEWS. As with the previous sitting on March 24, 35 MPs stood in for the full complement of 338 members due to the need for COVID-19 social distancing. Government briefing notes detailed "a bureaucracy reluctant to put inbound China passengers in mandatory quarantine or close borders to arrivals from other (COVID-19) hotspots." Yves-François Blanchet supported Trudeau when he "raised health and safety concerns over holding regular meetings (in order) to respect physical distancing". All that was needed to debate and to pass the bill to spend $73 billion were five hours.

On April 15, Trudeau warned against premature reopening of the economy, stating that "in order to get to that point, we need to continue doing what we are doing now for many more weeks".

Catherine McKenna announced on April 16 that the Ministry of Infrastructure and Communities sought shovel-ready infrastructure projects to receive in the 2020 construction season some "largely unspent" funds that had already been budgeted.

On April 20, Parliament's temporary suspension for five weeks expired and it voted to sit only once weekly on Wednesdays.
 
On April 28, it was revealed that "79 percent of all deaths in the country" were to that date connected with "long-term care and seniors' homes."

On April 30, the Parliamentary Budget Officer warned that the Federal deficit for fiscal year 2020 could be in excess of $252 billion.

May 

On May 1, 2020, royal assent was granted to Bill C-15, to implement the Canada Emergency Student Benefit (CESB), after a cursory one-day consideration by 35 MPs. It established a subsidy programme for secondary school graduates and post-secondary students. Students who cannot find employment or are unable to work due to the COVID-19 pandemic are eligible for CA$1,250 per month from May through August 2020.

On May 4, Trudeau discouraged Canadians from displaying complacency due to the lifting of economic restrictions by provinces, emphasizing that it was "extremely important" for citizens to continue practicing social distancing and personal hygiene to prevent the spread, and not go out "unless you absolutely have to". He explained that although the country was on a "positive trajectory", "we are not out of the woods, however, and it requires us to continue to remain attentive and vigilant and following the instructions set out by our public health officials."

Also on May 5, the Canadian red meat industry was granted access to federal COVID emergency subsidies.

By May 8, 60 percent of COVID-19 fatalities were in Quebec, which has around 20 percent of the nation's population. Montreal was called "the epicentre of the pandemic in Canada."

On May 11, Trudeau, Morneau and Bains in a press conference said that "a bridge financing facility for large employers that need help to get through the economic downturn caused by the coronavirus." One stated goal was "to avoid bankruptcies of otherwise viable firms wherever possible... Companies that use the lending facility will have to commit to respect collective bargaining agreements, protecting workers’ pensions, and support national climate goals. Rules on access to the money will place limits on dividends, share buy-backs and executive pay." The Large Employer Emergency Financing Facility (LEEFF) will only target companies with annual revenues in excess of $300 million.

On May 12, Parliamentary Budget Officer (PBO) Yves Giroux raised the possibility that the federal debt "will hit $1 trillion because of pandemic relief spending." Giroux said it was possible that pandemic programs could cost "more than what the entire federal government spent last year on everything", roughly $338 billion. Also on May 12, it was announced by Minister of International Development Karina Gould that $600 million would be contributed by the taxpayer to GAVI, "a vaccine alliance that improves vaccine access for vulnerable children around the world."

Also on May 12, Health Canada issued a press release with the announcement that the CCITF serological test would be administered to one million Canadians over the next two years. The government has selected DiaSorin to manufacture the tests. 
 
On May 14 Lufthansa Group announced it would resume flights between Toronto and Frankfurt as of June 3, as part of its resumption of global business.

On May 15, Conservative leader Andrew Scheer told a press conference that the Conservative caucus wanted Parliament to resume sitting as normal on May 25 and desired to withhold their consent to the 35-day rolling adjournment that prevents the regular operation of Parliament. Scheer observed that "Elected members of Parliament come here to be a voice for their constituents." Because all-party consent is required to suspend the animation of Parliament, it will need to resume sitting.

On May 19 during a press conference with Justin Trudeau and Theresa Tam that the 20th week of 2020 versus the same figures in 2019 saw a drop of 88 percent in land border crossers, and a 98 percent drop in international air travel. The following day CPHO Tam reversed her decision from March on the wearing of masks and began asking Canadians to start wearing masks.

On May 21, the Canadian Armed Forces, who had been tasked previously in Operation LASER with care for the senior citizens in the Long-Term Care Facilities of Ontario and Quebec had potentially been victimised by a COVID-19 SSEV. The disease affected 25 soldiers as of this date, but neither the CAF nor the DND would divulge details.

On May 25, Parliamentary Secretary to the Minister of National Defence Anita Vandenbeld disclosed to the third sitting of the resumed 43rd Canadian Parliament that 36 soldiers from Operation LASER had been infected with COVID-19 disease. Vandenbeld corrected for the record Cheryl Gallant who had been under the mistaken impression that only 28 soldiers (12 positives in Ontario and 16 in Quebec) had been infected. Also on that day, Doug Ford announced that Ontario had a heat map of the outbreak locations, and that Brampton, north Etobicoke, Scarborough, Peel Region, Windsor and Essex County were "lighting up like Christmas trees". It was disclosed that Toronto-area public health units account for 65% of cases in Ontario.

June 
On June 18, 2020, Canada reached 100,000 coronavirus cases, a little over three months since the suspension of Parliament for the same reason. A CBC News tally of reported deaths from COVID-19 on the same date was 8,348.

On June 24, Fitch Ratings Inc., a bond ratings agency, downgraded Canada's credit rating from triple-A to double-A-plus. The government had sported a triple-A credit rating with Fitch since the Martin government.

On June 25, former Clerk of the Privy Council of Canada Michael Wernick predicted that the one of the side-effects of the COVID-19 pandemic would be the shrinkage of the number of paid civil servants of Canada. He drew analogies to the debt problem in the 1980s which led "to a 1995 austerity budget that saw 45,000 public service jobs slashed, the elimination of 73 federal agencies, a 21 percent reduction in foreign aid and the privatization of Canadian National Railways." Wernick said that:

July 
The western provinces reported a surge in cases around the middle of July. Ontario reported 203 new cases in one day, Quebec reported 180 new cases in 24 hours, Alberta reported 368 new cases over the weekend, and Saskatchewan reported 120 in a previous week.

August 

On August 26, a 72 year-old New Zealand mariner named Peter Smith was threatened by Transport Canada as his Kiwi Roa sailed through the Northwest Passage, because the government "prohibited pleasure craft from operating in Arctic waters" from June 1 "to better protect Arctic communities" from COVID-19. Smith opined that the bureaucracy is "out of control and gone mad."

September 
In early September, federal Minister of Transport Marc Garneau remarked that airline passengers face a $1000 penalty fine if they refuse to wear a mask. The penalty was imposed in separate incidents (in June then July) on the first two passengers in September in order for others to reflect on the punished behaviour. Face coverings have been mandatory on flights since April 20. "Federal transport officials" were charged with issuing the fines "under the federal order". The same week, WestJet announced a new policy that include a 12-month long ban for passengers who ignored aircrew instructions to don masks. The PHAC stated that 378 domestic and 595 international flights between March 2  and August 24 had travellers on board who may have had the disease during their trip.

On September 7, Hajdu ordered an "independent review" of the "early warning system" after media reports in July documented how the Global Public Health Intelligence Network (GPHIN), formerly a PHAC subgroup, was deemed by a senior bureaucrat to be unnecessary.

On September 18, 2020, Conservative Party leader Erin O'Toole tested positive for COVID-19, after a staffer in his office tested positive. The same day, Bloc Quebecois leader Yves-François Blanchet also tested positive.

On September 23, in a speech from the throne, Prime Minister Trudeau declared Canada was currently in the second wave of COVID-19.

October 
On October 4 a West African man who had travelled onwards from Toronto to Halifax and thence to Deer Lake, Newfoundland died of COVID-19. Health officials decided to raise the alarm and request that passengers on the final leg of his flight "self-monitor for symptoms".

On October 19, Air Transat announced the closure of its Vancouver base and laid off half of its remaining flight attendants. Prior to the pandemic, the airline had employed 2,000 flight attendants. As of November, it planned to employ 117 flight attendants.
 
On October 20, aviation workers gathered to protest at Parliament Hill.

On October 22, the European Union cancelled the covid travel corridor that allowed Canadians to enter any European territory without quarantine lockdown. In June 2020, Canada had been as one of 14 countries that were allowed to enter by the EU. The reversal of status was caused by the resurgence in coronavirus cases that Canada began to experience in late October.

On October 23, apparel retailer Le Chateau, which had 123 locations across Canada and employed 1,400 people, announced it was filing for CCAA protection, blaming COVID-19.

November 
On November 6, Nunavut confirmed its first case in Sanikiluaq.

On November 10, as Manitoba went under lockdown, Trudeau "urged premiers and mayors across the country not to loosen restrictions for the sake of the economy and suggested localized shutdowns are needed in areas seeing a surge in cases", saying

On November 23, a report said that the Atlantic Bubble was defunct under pressure from increasing COVID-19 sightings.

On November 29, Public Safety Minister Bill Blair and Health Minister Patty Hajdu extended the ban on international travellers who had non-essential purposes. The rules were first imposed in March, and were to be extended until January 21, 2021 "for travellers entering Canada from a country other than the United States. Among the rules is a requirement for anyone entering the country to self-isolate for 14 days upon entry into Canada."

December 

Prime Minister Justin Trudeau announced on December 7, that the first of 249,000 doses out of a total of 4 million doses of the Pfizer–BioNTech COVID-19 vaccine will arrive before the end of the year. On December 9, the vaccine was approved by Health Canada for use.

On December 14, the first tranche of vaccinations began across the nation. Some sources initially indicated that Anita Quidangen, a personal support worker from Toronto, who was the first Canadian to receive a dose, but later it was determined that it was Gisèle Lévesque, an 89-year-old resident of a long-term care home in Quebec City who was the first.

Effective at 12:01am on December 21, Canada halted flights from the United Kingdom due to concerns over the Variant of Concern 202012/01 variant of SARS-CoV-2.

On December 23, Health Canada approved the mRNA-1273 COVID-19 vaccine developed by Moderna. Canada will receive up to 168,000 doses of the vaccine by the end of 2020, the first tranche of a total 40 million doses currently ordered for 2021.

On December 30, the Federal government announced all air travellers entering the country from outside of Canada must now provide a COVID-negative PCR test within 72 hours of boarding their flight into the country effective January 7, 2021. This is in addition to the mandatory 14-day quarantine mandated by the Quarantine Act. Additional rules also mean the traveller will have to spend time in a Federal facility if officers find their self-isolation plans unsatisfactory.

2021

January 

On January 7, the new rule for air travellers requiring a negative PCR test before boarding their departing flight to Canada came into effect. Travellers caught unaware of the new rules were reportedly turned away from their flights in countries like Cuba and Mexico. The test requirement came at the end of the travel ban on flights from U.K., amid fears of the spread of Variant of Concern 202012/01 variant of COVID-19. WestJet was highly critical of the new rules, citing the lack of time they had to prepare for the new requirements. Despite the new rules, passengers on 20 separate flights arriving from warmer climates (including United States, Barbados, Aruba, Mexico, Panama and the Dominican Republic) over the winter holidays were exposed to the virus before the new rules came into effect. Following the new rules, on January 21, 2021, Transport Minister Omar Alghabra announced at least 50,000 flights were cancelled in Canada.

On January 8, amid rising cases across the country, Prime Minister Trudeau promised a speed up of the vaccine rollout which has been criticized as being slow moving. The federal government supplies the vaccine doses, however it is up to the individual provinces to administer them. Reports of Canadian snowbirds travelling to the United States for quicker access to the vaccine have emerged. States like Florida and Arizona have lowered their requirements to include anyone over the age of 65 to have access to free vaccination.

In mid-January Pfizer notified Canada of its intentions to retool its manufacturing plant in Belgium in order to meet world-wide demands for the vaccine. Initially Canada was told it would receive less doses than anticipated, however, this was later changed to a significant drop in delivered doses and no doses the week of January 25. Provinces who have nearly depleted their current vaccine stock have set back dates to administer second doses of the vaccines to those who have already received their first, with uncertain medical knowledge lengthening the time of said second dose would affect efficacy.

On January 29, 2021, Prime Minister Trudeau announced new national travel restrictions, including the suspension of flights by major airlines to and from the Caribbean and Mexico beginning January 31 until April 30. In the coming weeks, new foreign flights must only land in Vancouver, Calgary, Toronto or Montreal and travellers must undergo a COVID-19 PCR test and isolate in an approved hotel while awaiting results at the traveller's expense.

Also on January 29, Moderna announced delays of 20 to 25 percent delivery of product to the country for the month of February.

February 

On February 2, 2021, Trudeau announced a deal with Novavax to produce COVID-19 vaccines at the Biologics Manufacturing Centre, making it the first to be produced domestically. The Novavax COVID-19 vaccine is currently awaiting approval by Health Canada. This is the first deal signed by Canada that allows a domestic manufacturing of a foreign vaccine. The contract with Novavax is for 52 million doses of the vaccine. Following the recommendations of the COVID-19 Vaccine and Therapeutics Task Forces and COVID-19 Joint Biomanufacturing Subcommittee, the federal government announced investment in two biomanufacturing companies—Vancouver-based Precision NanoSystems Incorporated (PNI) and Markham, Ontario-based Edesa Biotech Inc. (Edesa). PNI, biotechnology company, will receive up to $25.1 million to build a "$50.2 million biomanufacturing centre to produce vaccines and therapeutics for the prevention and treatment of diseases such as infectious diseases, rare diseases, cancer and other areas of unmet need". Edesa will receive up to $14 million to Edesa Biotech to "advance work on a monoclonal antibody therapy for acute respiratory distress syndrome, which is the leading cause of COVID-19 deaths.

On February 3, COVAX published the country-by-country vaccine distribution forecast to COVAX participants—Canada will receive 1,903,200 doses of the Oxford–AstraZeneca vaccine by the end of the first half of 2021.

On February 9, Prime Minister Trudeau announced a negative PCR test will be required within 72 hours of entering Canada through the land border with the United States. The change will come into effect on February 15.

On February 12, the Canadian government announced additional details about the incoming international travel measures first announced in late January. Effective February 22, all arriving international travellers will have to present a negative PCR COVID-19 test 72 hours before boarding their departing flight, take a PCR test on arrival in Canada and quarantine for three days at a supervised hotel for three days awaiting the results of their test at their own expense. Additionally they will be required to take a third PCR COVID-19 test at the end of their 14-day quarantine at home. Essential workers such as transport workers continue to be exempt from mandatory testing and quarantine.

On February 26, Health Canada approved the Oxford-AstraZeneca COVID-19 vaccine for use.

March 
On March 5, Health Canada approved the Janssen COVID-19 vaccine for use. The vaccine is the only approved vaccine to currently require one shot. Also on March 5, Pfizer announced an increase in vaccine delivery for the nation, adding an additional 1.5 million vaccines to its schedule by the end of March for a total of 8 million vaccines to be delivered.

April 
By April 11, influenced by major outbreaks of variants of concern in multiple provinces (including Alberta, B.C., Ontario, and Saskatchewan), and slow availability of vaccines, new cases per-million exceeded those of the United States.

November 
On November 28, the Government of Ontario announces that two cases of the Omicron variant (later named BA.1) have been found in Ottawa.

2022

May 
On May 3, the Public Health Agency of Canada reported one case of the Omicron BA.5 variant had been found in Canada.

July 
By July 2, the Omicron BA.5 variant had become the dominant variant in Ontario.

See also 
 2020 in Canada
 COVID-19 pandemic by country
 COVID-19 pandemic in North America
 National responses to the COVID-19 pandemic
 Healthcare in Canada

References

External links
 Coronavirus disease (COVID-19): Outbreak update Health Canada
 COVIDmapper – Mapping COVID-19 data from the past, present, and future (daily updated projections)

2020 disasters in Canada
2021 disasters in Canada
 
Disease outbreaks in Canada
Canada